The Golf Book (British Library Add MS 24098) is the common name for an illuminated manuscript Book of Hours in the Use of Rome dating from the 1540s. Only 23 pages remain of the original created by the illuminator Simon Bening and his studio in Bruges. It owes its popular name to one illustration in the calendar, with people playing a game resembling that of golf. It is presumed to have been made for a Swiss patron as the book includes a miniature painting of St Boniface of Lausanne.

See also
Hours of Hennessy

External links
 British Library catalogue record for manuscript, item Add MS 24098
 British Library online gallery (Virtual books, accessible version)

References

Illuminated books of hours
British Library additional manuscripts
1540s books
Golf books